Lewis Boss (26 October 1846 – 5 October 1912) was an American astronomer. He served as the director of the Dudley Observatory in Schenectady, New York.

Early life
Boss was born in Providence, Rhode Island to Samuel P. and Lucinda (née Joslin) Boss, and attended secondary school at the Lapham Institute in North Scituate and the New Hampton Institution in New Hampshire. In 1870, he graduated from Dartmouth College, then went to work as a clerk for the U.S. Government.

Career
He served as an assistant astronomer for a government expedition to survey the U.S-Canada–United States border. In 1876 he became the directory of the Dudley Observatory in Schenectady, New York.

Boss is noted for his work in cataloguing the locations and proper motions of stars. He also led an expedition to Chile in 1882 to observe the transit of Venus, and catalogued information concerning cometary orbits. His most significant discovery was the calculation of the convergent point of the Hyades star cluster. He was awarded the Gold Medal of the Royal Astronomical Society in 1905.

He became editor of the Astronomical Journal in 1909, and the following year published Preliminary General Catalogue of 6188 Stars for the Epoch 1900, a compilation of the proper motions of stars. Following his death, responsibility for the Astronomical Journal passed to his son, Benjamin Boss. Benjamin continued to edit the journal until 1941 and also expanded his father's star catalogue, publishing the Boss General Catalogue in 1936.

Death and legacy
Boss died on October 5. 1912 in Albany, New York. The Moon crater Boss is named in his honor.

Family life
Boss married Helen M. Hutchinson on December 30, 1871. Their son Benjamin Boss was also a noted astronomer.

See also

 Boss General Catalogue

References

Sources 
 Much of this article was based on the Dudley Observatory history of Lewis Boss.

External links  
 Preliminary General Catalogue of 6188 Stars for the Epoch 1900 
 National Academy of Sciences Biographical Memoir
 Dudley Observatory
	
	

1846 births
1912 deaths
Corresponding members of the Saint Petersburg Academy of Sciences
American astronomers
Scientists from Schenectady, New York
Recipients of the Gold Medal of the Royal Astronomical Society
People from Providence, Rhode Island
Dartmouth College alumni
People from Albany, New York
Recipients of the Lalande Prize
The Astronomical Journal editors